Stephen Thomas Erlewine (born June 18, 1973) is an American music critic and senior editor for the online music database AllMusic. He is the author of many artist biographies and record reviews for AllMusic, as well as a freelance writer, occasionally contributing liner notes.

Erlewine was born in Ann Arbor, Michigan, and is a nephew of the former musician and AllMusic founder Michael Erlewine. He studied at the University of Michigan, where he majored in English, and was a music editor (1993–94) and then arts editor (1994–1995) of the school's paper The Michigan Daily, and DJ'd at the campus radio station, WCBN. He has contributed to many books, including All Music Guide to Rock: The Definitive Guide to Rock, Pop, and Soul and All Music Guide to Hip-Hop: The Definitive Guide to Rap & Hip-Hop.

References

External links
Erlewine's page at Pitchfork.com
Contributions to Rolling Stone
Writings for Billboard
Articles for Spin

1973 births
Living people
AllMusic
American music critics
American music journalists
Writers from Ann Arbor, Michigan
University of Michigan College of Literature, Science, and the Arts alumni
People from Austin, Texas
The Michigan Daily alumni